The Hradecky Bridge is one of the first hinged bridges in the world, the first and only preserved cast iron bridge in Slovenia, and one of its most highly valued technical achievements. It spans the Ljubljanica River in Ljubljana. At the time of its construction, it was praised as elegant, very modern, and economical. Because it was later used to transport the dead from the Ljubljana hospital to the mortuary, it was nicknamed the Mortuary Bridge, but has retained its beauty and technical perfection. Throughout history, both names have persisted.

Since 2011, it has been located at an extension of Hren Street between the Krakovo Embankment and the Gruden Embankment, connecting the Trnovo District and the Prule neighbourhood in the Center District. It has three articulated arches, each of them made of two parts, joined with a bolt by the principle of the charnier arch at the highest point of the arch. Technically, it quite surpasses the Iron Bridge in England. The elements are joined with screws instead of wedges, and reinforcing bars and hollow elements were used instead of full pylons, which has enabled the bridge to be much lighter, but stable.

The Hradecky Bridge was manufactured according to the plans of the senior engineer Johann Hermann from Vienna at the Auersperg iron foundry in Dvor near Žužemberk, and was installed as the first cast iron bridge in Ljubljana in 1867, at the location of today's Cobblers' Bridge. It was named after the former Ljubljana mayor Johann Nepomuk Hradeczky, who had the most merit for its construction. In 1931, when the architect Jože Plečnik planned the new Cobblers' Bridge, he moved the Hradecky Bridge further down the Ljubljanica near the former Ljubljana mortuary in the vicinity of Zalog Street. The original gas lamps were replaced with decorative facets. In 2004, it was closed to traffic, and in 2009 a footbridge was built next to it. In 2010, it was removed from the location, renovated, and transferred to its current site in 2011. It is now used only by pedestrians and cyclists.

References

External links

Bridges in Ljubljana
Bridges completed in 1867
Cast-iron arch bridges
Bridges over the Ljubljanica
Arch bridges in Slovenia